Walter Noble Burns (1866–1932) was a writer of Western history and a Western fiction author. He was notable for his book, The Saga of Billy the Kid (1926).

Family
Born on October 24, 1866  in Lebanon, Kentucky, he was the son of Thomas E. Burns (1837–1908), a colonel in the Union Army during the American Civil War. Walter's mother, Mary Crisella Noble (1847–1871) had died when he was four years old. Then, he and his father, Thomas E. Burns had resided with his mother's parents: Lorenzo H. Noble (1819-1899) and Alice Ann Noble (1823-1899) during the 1870 & 1880 Federal Census in Marion Co., Kentucky.  Noble was an attorney from Maine, who had migrated to Kentucky, and became a prominent attorney & judge.  Walter married Rose Marie Hoke on 10 November 1902.

Career
Walter Noble Burns served with the 1st Kentucky Infantry during the Spanish–American War in 1898. In 1900, he moved to Chicago, Illinois and began a career as a journalist, literary critic and crime reporter. After World War I, Burns retired as a reporter, then concentrated his writing about Western American legends.

Publications
 Year With a Whaler, 1913
 The Saga of Billy the Kid 1926
 Tombstone: an Iliad of the Southwest 1927
 The One-way Ride: The red trail of Chicago gangland from prohibition to Jake Lingle 1931
 The Robin Hood of El Dorado: The Saga of Joaquin Murrieta, Famous Outlaw of California's Age of Gold 1932

Biography
Mark J. Dworkin (1946–2012) compiled a biography about Walter Noble Burns, entitled American Mythmaker: Walter Noble Burns and the Legends of Billy the Kid, Wyatt Earp, and Joaquín Murrieta. Dworkin died in 2012, prior to the completion of this book, which was published in 2015 by the University of Oklahoma Press.

References

External links
 
 Walter Noble Burns Papers, Special Collections, University of Arizona, Tucson, Arizona
 Walter Noble Burns Papers, 1908-1964 at Arizona Archives Online
 
 History.net: Walter Noble Burns, The Wild West's Premier Mythmaker
 Goodreads, The Saga of Billy the Kid
 American Mythmaker: Walter Noble Burns and the Legends of Billy the Kid, Wyatt Earp, and Joaquín Murrieta: By Mark J. Dworkin, University of Oklahoma Press, 2015.
 Preston Lewis Author: Words of the West - Billy the Who?

1866 births
1932 deaths
20th-century American male writers
American male non-fiction writers
People from Lebanon, Kentucky
Western (genre) writers